Danny Lamar Copeland (born January 24, 1966) is a former American football defensive back who played five seasons in the National Football League (NFL).  He started in Super Bowl XXVI for the Washington Redskins.

College career
He played college football at Eastern Kentucky University.

Professional career
The lone touchdown of his career came in a 1992 game against the Dallas Cowboys, when he recovered a fumble in the end zone with about three minutes left in the game, giving the Redskins a 20–17 win. Copeland surprised the Redskins by announcing his retirement before the 1994 season despite the fact that he had started 14 games and recorded 125 tackles the previous season. He stated injuries and reduced desire to play as the reasons for his retirement at the age of 28. He had 327 tackles and two interceptions in his three seasons as a Redskin.

Personal life
Since retiring from football, Copeland moved back to Georgia and founded COGI Athletic Company, Inc. He is also a motivational speaker.

References

1966 births
Living people
People from Camilla, Georgia
American football safeties
Eastern Kentucky Colonels football players
Kansas City Chiefs players
Washington Redskins players